Mount Ulla (also known as Claymore Peak) is a sharp peak between Meserve and Hart Glaciers in the Asgard Range, Victoria Land. The summit is a knife-edge ridge which drops away on both sides. Named by the Victoria University of Wellington Antarctic Expedition (VUWAE), 1958–59, after one of the Norse Vanir gods.

Mountains of the Asgard Range
McMurdo Dry Valleys